Long Live the King (Korean: 롱 리브 더 킹: 목포 영웅; RR: Long Live The King: Mokpo Yeongwoong) is a 2019 South Korean film directed by Kang Yoon-sung and starring Kim Rae-won. The screenplay is based on Beodeunamusup's webtoon of the same name, using story elements from the first season.

The film earned director Kang Yoon-sung the Director of the Year Award and Kim Rae-won the Actor of the Year Award at the 2019 Chungju International Film Festival.

Filming began on October 9, 2018. One of the plot elements involves a bus accident at a bridge in Mokpo; it took the crew three months to make arrangements to film on the bridge, with filming at the location taking place for about twelve hours. Shooting for the scene was also done at the studio and other locations, and took about a week to finish.

Plot 
Mob boss Jang Se-chool meets lawyer Kang So-hyun at an anti-construction protest and quickly falls in love, but she thinks of him as a thug. She repeatedly rejects him while telling him to live a decent life. So-hyun eventually tries to get rid of Se-chool by saying that she can never accept him because her life goal is to become a first lady. Meanwhile, one of Se-chool's friends is on death row, and the only way to save him is through a presidential pardon. When Se-chool ends up rescuing passengers after a bus accident at Mokpo Bridge, he is praised as a hero; he decides to use his newfound fame to run for public office, believing that success will lead him to win So-hyun's heart and save his friend.

Cast 

 Kim Rae-won as Jang Se-Chool
 Won Jin-ah as Kang So-Hyun
 Jin Seon-kyu as Jo Kwang-Choon
 Choi Gwi-hwa as Choi Man-Soo
 Choi Moo-sung as Hwang Bo-Yoon
 Joo Jin-mo as So-pal
 Choi Jae-hwan as Ho-Tae
 Cha Yub as Geun-Bae
 Yoo Hee-je as Im Jik-sa
 Im Hyung-joon as Han Man-Sub
 Hong Ki-joon as Jung Chul-Min

Release and reception 
Long Live the King was released on June 19, 2019, and grossed $3.5 million on its opening weekend, ultimately grossing $8 million at the South Korea box office. The Korea Herald described the plot as “clunky” and Kim Rae-won's performance as “one of his finest works.”

References

External links
 
 

2019 films
South Korean comedy films
2010s Korean-language films
2019 comedy films
2010s South Korean films